Rolf Olander (born 13 September 1934) is a Swedish former swimmer. He competed in the men's 4 × 200 metre freestyle relay at the 1952 Summer Olympics.

References

External links
 

1934 births
Living people
Olympic swimmers of Sweden
Swimmers at the 1952 Summer Olympics
People from Skellefteå Municipality
Swedish male freestyle swimmers
Sportspeople from Västerbotten County